Shrinebuilder is the self-titled debut album by American heavy metal supergroup Shrinebuilder. It was released on October 12, 2009, via Neurot Recordings. Drummer and producer Dale Crover commented that this was "an experiment that actually worked".

Reception

Critic Philip Whitehouse described it as "expansive, intriguing and engrossing material from the cream of the doom metal crop." Derrick Koo of The Quietus remarked how "Shrinebuilder doesn't try to explore new territory, but it captures its players doing what they do best", but wondered if it is "possible for a supergroup like this one to truly step out of its predecessors' long shadows." Classic Rock reviewer described the album as "the work of kindred spirits, (...) which allows each member's voice to shine through", and indicated the song "Blind for All to See" as the best track.

Track listing 
All songs written by Shrinebuilder.

Personnel 
 Scott "Wino" Weinrich – vocals on tracks 1, 4–5, guitar
 Scott Kelly – vocals, guitar
 Al Cisneros – vocals on tracks 2, 5, bass
 Dale Crover – drums, backing vocals on tracks 3–5
 Toshi Kasai – keyboards
 The Deaf Nephews (Dale Crover and Toshi Kasai) – production

References

External links
 Neurot Recordings album profile
 BBC Music album review

2009 albums
Shrinebuilder albums
Neurot Recordings albums